Chamaesphecia annellata is a moth of the family Sesiidae. It is found from Germany and Poland south to Greece and Turkey and east to southern Russia and the Caucasus.

The wingspan is 14–17 mm. Adults are on wing from June to September.

The larvae feed on Ballota nigra.

References

Moths described in 1847
Sesiidae
Moths of Europe
Moths of Asia